Ken Guertin (born November, 1966 in Michigan) is an American film director, screenwriter,  producer and editor.

Filmography (as writer and director)
 The Incorporated (2000)
 Bank Brothers (2004)

Notes

References

External links 
 

American male screenwriters
American film directors
Living people
1966 births
Date of birth missing (living people)